Sensible World of Soccer was designed and developed by Sensible Software as the 1994 sequel to their 1992 game Sensible Soccer which combined a 2D football game with a comprehensive manager mode. The game includes contemporary season data of professional football from around the world, with a total number of 1,500 teams and 27,000 players.

Although the gameplay is simple (eight directions and one fire button) a large variety of context sensitive actions can be performed without any predefined keys.

In 1996 the game was ranked best of all time by Amiga Power. In 1996, GamesMaster ranked the Amiga version 36th on their "Top 100 Games of All Time." In 2004, the Amiga version of Sensible World of Soccer was inducted into GameSpot's list of the greatest games of all time. In 2007, Henry Lowood, Curator for History of Science and Technology Collections in the Stanford University together with game designers Warren Spector and Steve Meretzky, researcher Matteo Bittanti and journalist Christopher Grant compiled a definitive list of "the ten most important video games of all time". This list included Sensible World of Soccer. Sensible World of Soccers inclusion in this list is notable on three accounts: it is the only game in the list developed in Europe, it is the only sports game in the list, and it is the most recent game in the list.

Career mode
The career game mode in Sensible World of Soccer enables players to manage a club through 20 seasons. Basic manager options include a transfer market (buy/sell players).

Every team has a squad of 16 players, by default. Every player has individual skills (speed, tackling, heading, finishing, shooting, passing, ball control). Player prices are calculated relative to their skills. Players can be transferred from other clubs by offering an amount of money and/or own players in a part exchange deal.  To be able to buy stronger players and to keep them it is necessary to earn money with success in the various competitions. Job offers from other clubs and also from a national team may roll in, depending on the success.

Title song
"Goalscoringsuperstarhero" by Jon Hare (born 1966) and Richard Joseph (1953–2007), vocals by Jackie Reed, was composed for SWOS. The original song published in 1994 only had one verse, for the version of the games published in 2006 Hare wrote two more verses and he and Joseph re-recorded the song with original vocalist Jackie Reed who also appears with the Sensible team in the intro video to the game on some formats. The CD versions of the 2006 version of the game also include the 2006 studio recording as an audio track.

Lyrics:
You're a goalscoring superstar hero
You let your hair down and play to the fans
You're a goalscoring superstar hero
And every goal says you're the best in the land

Commentary from a seemingly fictitious match is also interspersed within the song:

Passes to Walker, passes to Gibson -- OH, IT'S IN THE BACK OF THE NET, I DON'T BELIEVE IT THEY'VE SCORED!

Two more verses have been added for Sensible Soccer 2006:

You're a goalscoring superstar hero
We sing your song and you turn up the heat
You're a goalscoring superstar hero
And with your ball control you have the world at your feet

You're a goalscoring superstar hero
I got your name on the back of my shirt
You're a goalscoring superstar hero
You drive me wild I wanna be your superstargirl

History

Sensible World of Soccer
The first release from 1994 for Amiga had some bugs which were fixed with a free update disk a few months later (SWOS v1.1). A PC version came later, in 1995, as floppy disk version and as CD-ROM (including voice commentary).

Teams present included all European nations as well as (in this version only) 64 fantasy squads whose line-ups were references to and parodies of other concepts. Gameplay was noticeably easier than in subsequent versions, with computer opponents rarely able to tackle the player or create chances. Unique to the release was the choice of an "astro turf", whose conditions mimicked artificial pitches installed in the 1980s by some clubs.

Sensible World of Soccer '95/'96
The 95/'96 Edition was an improved version for Amiga, with updated data, new menus and an enhanced gameplay (now with the possibility to do headers from standing positions and low passes with curling effect), which was also found in subsequent releases.

SWOS '95/'96 European Championship Edition
In time of the UEFA Euro 1996, the European Championship Edition (aka ECE or SWOSECE) was released. This version is equal to 95/'96 Edition, but included the actual European Championship as a preset competition with updated teams. This version was released for PC as well as for Amiga computers.

Sensible World of Soccer 96/'97
The release of 1996 was the final version of the SWOS sequel, for Amiga (two floppy disks) and PC (CD-ROM). It contained the updated data of the season and a new cover. 
It is also the base for the remake on Xbox Live Arcade in 2007.

Other releases
Also in 1996 an upgrade was released in a double CD case of SWOS '96/'97, for PC (CD) and Amiga (disks), upgrading an older version of SWOS to 96/'97. Nowadays they are considered as rare collectors' items. Later there was also a White Label version containing the European Championship Edition, published by Virgin Interactive.

After SWOS development ended in 1996, some fan projects tried to keep SWOS up-to-date, like the Cresswell brothers from England who collected data from several internet forums and created an unofficial update to '97/'98 for Amiga. During the 1998 World Cup in France they made a special update, which was based on 97/'98 and contained also some new graphics. This "World Cup 98 update" was officially supported by Sensible Software and released on the Cover CD number 24 of the magazine "CU Amiga". But to use this update a hard disk installation was required which officially does not exist.

There were some demo versions (Amiga) on several cover disks. One of the best known is "Sensible World of Moon Soccer" which allowed users to try in-game options. On pitch action was placed on the moon, with craters on the pitch and moon-like ball physics.

The Amiga version received a fan update for the 2022/2023 season in 2023.

Comeback
Any attempts since 1998 to bring back Sensible Soccer as a 3D game were not successful. It became quiet about Sensible Soccer after Codemasters' takeover of Sensible Software in 1999. In 2005 Sensible Soccer was released as a mobile phone game. Although the controls on mobile phones are usually a bit complicated, the game sold well enough to make new releases of the series possible. After a 2 Player Plug 'n' Play version, a small mini console with two controllers and TV-out (containing Mega Lo Mania and Cannon Fodder besides Sensible Soccer), Codemasters decided to release Sensible Soccer 2006 right in time for the World Cup in Germany. The game seemed to be unfinished and had major bugs. About the same time they released Sensible Soccer Skillz, another game for mobile phones which contained just a few mini games such as penalties or corner kicks.

Due to recent popularity of retro games, Codemasters decided to release SWOS on Xbox LIVE Arcade. It was originally planned for August 2007, but was delayed until late December. After its release, the online mode became the reason to pull the game from the Xbox LIVE Marketplace. SWOS saw its final release two days later on December 2, without any official announcements.

The game is a straight port of the Amiga version of SWOS '96/'97 and uses some elements of the PC release. The graphics are enhanced (HD mode) and features the music from Sensible Soccer 2006. During the game graphics can be switched to the classic mode. SWOS is the first XBLA game which uses the technology of Massive Inc. to show commercials within the game, updated over the network. The game's price is 800 MS Points. Meanwhile, there are packs of SWOS-related gamer pictures and themes, the price for both in each case is 150 MS Points and they could be downloaded on the Marketplace.

Bugs in the online mode were reported by consumers in the official forum and were also mentioned in critically acclaimed game reviews, but Codemasters said that there are no plans for patches, bugfixes or other SWOS-related releases in the near future. In regard to this the previously announced Windows Vista version was not released.

Competitions and events

Tournaments are mainly organized by the fans themselves. Events in the past were the World SWOS Tournaments (WST) of the "SWOS Witnesses" in Serbia and the tournaments of the ISSA (International Sensible Soccer Association) in Copenhagen/Denmark, both played on the PC DOS version of the game. The game is also very popular in Poland and Germany where tournaments take place on a regular basis (Amiga & PC DOS).

Since 2004 SensibleSoccer.de offers SWOS online play, and national and international tournaments and leagues are being organized and played on a monthly basis.  The community uses Discord to organize online play.

SensibleSoccer.de is host of the "Sensible Days", an annual meeting of SWOS fans with international championships on PC and Amiga in the manner of a LAN party. Since 2008, the "Sensible Days" are acknowledged by Codemasters as the official SWOS World Cups. Since then the place of event changed yearly throughout Europe. Game developer Jon Hare visited the tournament in Berlin, 2013.

History of Sensible Days (SWOS World Cup Tournaments) 

In 2023, the Sensible Days World Cup will take place in Wandlitz near Berlin, Germany on 5/6 August.

References

External links
www.sensiblesoccer.de – SWOS United community, host of online leagues & offline tournaments
www.swosit.com – Italian community, online career mode
SWOS - Xbox.com – Xbox Live Marketplace
database.swoes.info – Complete database of SWOS '96/'97

1994 video games
Amiga games
Association football management video games
DOS games
Games commercially released with DOSBox
Sensible Software
Sports video games with career mode
Video games scored by Richard Joseph
Video games developed in the United Kingdom
Xbox 360 Live Arcade games